Seymour College is an independent, Uniting Church, day and boarding school for girls, located at Glen Osmond, Adelaide, South Australia.

Established in 1922 as Presbyterian Girls' College, Seymour has a non-selective enrolment policy and currently caters for students from pre-school (4 years of age) to Year 12, including 105 boarders. In addition, The Early Years at Seymour offers a co-educational program for children from 6 weeks of age. The college is girls only from Prep (4 years of age) to Year 12.

The college is affiliated with the Alliance of Girls' Schools Australasia (AGSA), the Independent Primary School Heads of Australia (IPSHA), the Association of Heads of Independent Schools of Australia, (AHISA), the Australian Boarding Schools' Association, (ABSA), the Uniting Church in Australia and the International Baccalaureate Organisation.

Academic
In 2018, Seymour restructured its Middle School curriculum, introducing two 'super subjects', GEM and STEM from Year 6. Principal, Kevin Tutt, has introduced a wellbeing framework, GIRLbeing, which is delivered via the Strength, Optimism and Justice (SOJ) program.

Service
Crescam Ministrando, I grow by serving, has been the college's motto and guiding philosophy since the college's foundation in 1922. Service Learning is embedded in the curriculum from Reception to Year 12 and the whole-school approach is centred around ‘Justice’ for people and the world in which they live.

Campus
Seymour College is situated on a single 10 hectare campus, located 5 km southeast of the Adelaide city centre, in the Adelaide foothills. The campus is a blend of both old and new buildings. Some of the college's notable older buildings include the historic "Barr Smith House" (formerly the "Wooton Lea" mansion), the bluestone and brick former laundry, stables and cottages, pump house, and the former coach-house turned music room.
Other facilities include: two theatres, a Sports Centre including facilities for indoor basketball, netball, tennis, badminton, weights training and exercise, a science centre, two libraries, swimming pool, an oval for athletics, softball, soccer, and hockey, and a Boarding House including dining hall and health centre.

House system
As with most Australian schools, Seymour College uses a house system; however, it is unique in that it is referred to as a "Clan" system. The four Clans are: Bruce (White); Cameron (Yellow); Douglas (Blue) and Stewart (Red). The four Clans compete against each other each year in various events for the Clan Cup. These events include Swimming Carnival, Sports Day, Clan Choral, Clash of the Clans, and the Clan Can Plan.

Sport 
Seymour College is a member of the Independent Girls Schools Sports Association (IGSSA).

IGSSA premierships 
Seymour College has won the following IGSSA premierships.

 Athletics (2) - 2000, 2002
 Badminton (4) - 1994, 1998, 1999, 2007
 Basketball (2) - 2012, 2014
 Hockey (15) - 1987, 1997, 1999, 2000, 2001, 2002, 2004, 2007, 2008, 2009, 2010, 2011, 2012, 2013, 2018
 Netball - 2003
 Soccer (3) - 1999, 2002, 2004
 Swimming (2) - 2013, 2018
 Tennis (3) - 1995, 1998, 2004
 Volleyball (7) - 1999, 2002, 2008, 2009, 2010, 2011, 2012

Notable alumnae
Alumnae of Seymour College/Presbyterian Girls' College are known as Old Collegians and may elect to join the schools alumni association, the Old Collegians Association.

Rhodes Scholars
Since Rhodes Scholarships were first awarded to South Australian women in 1980, three have been awarded to Seymour Old Collegians:
 1988 Kathryn Brown
 1997 Elizabeth Wall
 2004 Rachel Swift

Some notable Old Collegians include:

Academic

Jenny Graves – professor of the Research School of Biological Sciences at the Australian National University; Director of the Australian Research Council Centre for Kangaroo Genomics; Recipient of the Centenary Medal 2003
Linley Martin – Commissioner of Tertiary Education Quality and Standards Agency, Vice-President (Academic and Information Services) and Council Secretary of Deakin University
Professor Janice Reid AC – Vice-Chancellor and University President at the University of Western Sydney; Recipient of the Centenary Medal 2003
Judith Roberts AO – Deputy Chancellor of Flinders University; Trained Nurse/Voluntary Community Worker; Former President of The Cancer Council Australia, and the Family Services Council Aust; Foundation Chair of the Helpmann Academy Board; Former President of Relationships Australia; Former Director of the Office for the Ageing SA Government

Professor Christina Slade – Conjoint Dean of Arts and Social Sciences at City University London; Professor of Media Theory at the Universiteit Utrecht Netherlands
Claire Woods – Professor of Communication and Writing at the University of South Australia; Recipient of the Max Harris Literary Award 2002; (also attended Rumson-Fair Haven Regional High School)

Business
Leonie Clyne – managing director of Angus Clyne Australia Pty Ltd; Recipient of the Inaugural Enterprising Woman of the Year Award
Carolyn Hewson (née Somerville) – Company Director; Director of AGL Energy Ltd, and Westpac Banking Corp.
Elizabeth Lewis-Gray – chairman and chief executive officer of Gekko Systems Pty Ltd; Director of Austmine Limited

Entertainment, media and the arts
Janet Bridgland – artist and illustrator
Helen Leake – CEO of the South Australian Film Corporation (2004–07), Company Director/Producer of Duo Art Productions (1996–2004)
Penny Matthews (née Vigar) – children's author
Georgina McGuinness – weekend news presenter for National Nine News Adelaide
 Poh Ling Yeow – runner-up in Masterchef Australia 
 Alice Monfries – news reporter, journalist
 Olivia Rogers – Miss Universe Australia 2017

Medicine and science
Freda Evelyn Gibson – Pioneering Flying Doctor
Dr Rhodanthe Grace Lipsett OAM - Midwife and author

Politics, public service and the law
Justice Catherine Margaret Branson – Judge of the Federal Court of Australia
Diana Laidlaw AM – Vigneron; MLC (Liberal) for South Australia (1982–2003), SA Minister for Transport and Urban Planning (1997–2002), The Arts (1993–2002), the Status of Women (1993–2002), (Transport) 1993–97; SA Shadow Minister for Transport, Marine, Arts and Cultural Heritage, Status of Women, Local Govt Relations (1992–93), Tourism (1986–93)
Susan Elizabeth Tanner – Australian Ambassador to Spain and Andorra (2003–06), Assistant Secretary Europe Br. DFAT (2000–02), Australian Ambassador to Chile, Bolivia and Peru (1997–99)

Sport
Kimberley Wells (cyclist), Professional Cyclist and Australian National Criterium Champion 2013 & 2015 (Australian National Criterium Championships)

Notable staff
Phyllis Duguid  (1904–1993), née Lade, English teacher and Aboriginal rights and women's activist

See also
List of schools in South Australia
List of boarding schools

References

External links
Seymour College Website

Private primary schools in Adelaide
Private secondary schools in Adelaide
Uniting Church schools in Australia
Educational institutions established in 1922
Boarding schools in South Australia
Girls' schools in South Australia
Junior School Heads Association of Australia Member Schools
1922 establishments in Australia
Alliance of Girls' Schools Australasia